TIMGlobal Media, (formerly Thomas Industrial Media), headquartered in Uccle (Belgium) and founded in 1975, is a sister company of Thomas Publishing Company, which was founded in New York in 1898 and produced the first Thomas Register of American Manufacturers in 1902.  It provides print and online information about non-United States companies and products.

Current international publications and websites 
IEN Europe (Industrial Engineering News Europe, 1975) Provides industrial designers and manufacturing executives with general industrial engineering news and solutions.
PCN Europe (Processing and Control News Europe, 2004) Covers industry news, application stories and product news from and for the processing world, including the chemical and pharmaceutical, food and beverage, oil and gas, as well as the rubber and the plastic industries.
Energy Efficiency: business & industry (2011) Established at the European Commission, is set up to promote business dialogue and better industrial energy efficiency policy.
icatalogs (2011)  An online showcase of industrial catalogs from suppliers located internationally.

Current publications and websites devoted to specific countries 
IEN D-A-CH, (1982 - first being published as Technische Revue) Product news and solutions for the manufacturing industries of German-speaking Europe.
IEN Italia (Industrial Engineering News Italia, 1999) Interviews, application stories, industry news, market research abstracts and product news for Italian-speaking industrial designers and manufacturing executives.
Il Distributore Industriale - Targeted to key-management in the distribution field, and provides a marketing perspective of relations between production and distribution as well as suggestions of industrial strategies in the Italian distribution market.
Costruzione e Manutenzione Impianti - Components, machinery and services for design, construction and maintenance of facilities.
Manutenzione Tecnica e Management - The official technical journal of the Italian Maintenance Association (A.I.MAN). It covers the Maintenance, Repair, Processing and MRO markets in Italy.
PEI France (Produits Equipements Industriels, 1989) Provides a summary of the latest product and technological developments that are available to the French market.
Electronique Composants & Instrumentation - for design engineers, design management, procurement and decision makers in the French electronics industry.
Endüstri Dünyası (2007) Product news and solutions for the Turkish market.

External links
 Thomas Industrial Media's official website

References

Mass media companies of Belgium
Mass media companies established in 1975
Companies based in Brussels